Steven "Steve" Smith (November 29, 1949 – c. April 7, 2014) was a Minnesota politician and a member of the Minnesota House of Representatives representing District 33A, which includes portions of Hennepin and Wright counties in the western Twin Cities metropolitan area. A Republican, he was an attorney by profession.

Smith was first elected in 1990, and was reelected every two years thereafter until defeated in 2012. Prior to the 1992 legislative redistricting, he represented the old District 43A, and prior to the 2002 redistricting, he represented the old District 34A. His top legislative priorities included tax cuts and government reform.

Smith was vice chair of the House Ethics Committee, a member of the Finance Committee, and a member of the Finance subcommittee for the Public Safety Finance Division. He served as deputy minority leader. He was chair of the Civil Law Committee from 1999–2002, the Judiciary Policy and Finance Committee during the 2003-2004 biennium, and the Public Safety Policy and Finance Committee during the 2005-2006 biennium.

After being redistricted into a new district, Smith was defeated in the 2012 Republican primary by Tea Party activist Cindy Pugh.

Smith graduated from Lester Prairie High School in Lester Prairie, then went on to the University of Minnesota in Minneapolis, graduating with a B.A. in political science. He then attended Oklahoma City University School of Law in Oklahoma City, Oklahoma, earning his J.D. He served on the Mound City Council from 1984–1986, and as mayor of Mound from 1987-1990. He was found dead at his home, where he lived alone, on April 7, 2014.

References

External links 

 Minnesota Public Radio Votetracker: Rep. Steve Smith
 Project Votesmart - Rep. Steve Smith Profile

1949 births
2014 deaths
People from Mound, Minnesota
Republican Party members of the Minnesota House of Representatives
Minnesota lawyers
Minnesota city council members
Mayors of places in Minnesota
University of Minnesota College of Liberal Arts alumni
Oklahoma City University School of Law alumni
21st-century American politicians
20th-century American lawyers